This is a list of Royal Navy ship names starting with I, J, K, and L.

I

 Ibis
 Icarus
 
 Ickford
 Ignition
 Ildefonso
 Ilex
 Ilfracombe
 Illustrious
 Ilmington
 Ilston
 Imaum
 Immortalite
 Imogen
 Imogene
 Imperial
 Imperieuse
 Impeteux
 Impey
 Implacable
 Impregnable
 Impregnable I
 Impregnable II
 Impregnable III
 Impregnable IV
 Impulsive
 Incendiary
 Inconstant
 Increase
 Indefatigable
 Independencia
 
 Indian
 Indignant
 Indomitable
 Indus
 Indus II
 Indus III
 Indus IV
 Indus V
 Industry
 Infanta Don Carlos
 Infanta
 Infernal
 Inflexible
 Inglefield
 Inglesham
 Inglis
 Ingonish
 Inman
 Insolent
 Inspector
 Instow
 Integrity
 Intelligence
 Intelligent
 Intrepid
 Invention
 Invermoriston
 Inverness
 Inverlyon
 Investigator
 Inveterate
 Invicta
 Invincible
 
 Iphigenia
 Ipswich
 Iris
 Iron Duke
 Iroquois
 Irresistible
 Irvine
 Irwell
 Isabella
 Isham
 Isinglass
 Isis
 Iskra
 Islay
 
 
 
 
 Islip
 Ister
 Itchen
 Ithuriel
 Ivanhoe
 Iveston
 Ivy

J

 
 
 
 
 
 
 
 
 
 
 
 
 
 
 Jalouse
 Jamaica
 
 James & Eliza
 James Galley
 James Watt
 Jane
 Janissary
 Janus
 Jaseur
 Jasmine
 Jason
 Jasper
 Java
 Javelin
 Jed
 Jellicoe
 Jemmy
 
 

 Jeremiah
 Jerfalcon
 
 
 
 
 
 
 
 Jesus of Lübeck
 
 
 
 John & Martha
 John & Peter
 John & Sarah
 John Ballinger
 John Baptist
 John Ebbs
 John Evangelist
 John of Dublin
 John of Greenwich
 Johnson
 Jolly
 Jonquil
 
 
 Josiah
 Joyful
 Jubilant
 Julia
 Julian
 Juliet
 Julius
 Jumna
 
 Juniper
 Juno
 Junon
 Jupiter
 Juste
 Justitia
 Jutland

K

 K1
 K2
 K3
 K4
 K5
 K6
 K7
 K8
 K9
 K10
 K11
 K12
 K13
 K14
 K15
 K16
 K17
 K18
 K19
 K20
 K21
 K22
 K23
 K24
 K25
 K26
 K27
 K28
 Kale
 Kalgoorlie
 
 Kandahar
 Kangaroo
 Karakatta
 Karanja
 
 

 
 Katherine Bark
 Katherine Breton
 Katherine Fortileza

 Katherine Galley
 Katoomba
 Keats
 Kedleston
 
 
 Kellett
 Kellington
 Kelly
 Kelvin
 Kemerton
 Kempenfelt
 Kempthorne
 Kempton
 Kendal
 Kenilworth Castle
 Kennet
 Kennington
 Kennymore
 
 Kentish
 Kenya
 Keppel
 Keren
 Kertch
 Keryado
 Kestrel
 Kew
 Khartoum
 Khedive
 Kiawo
 Kilbane
 Kilbarchan
 Kilbeggan
 Kilberry
 Kilbirnie
 Kilbrachan
 Kilbride
 Kilbrittain
 Kilburn
 Kilby
 Kilcar
 Kilcavan
 Kilchattan
 Kilchreest
 Kilchrenan
 Kilchvan
 Kilclare
 Kilcolgan
 Kilconnan
 Kilconnel
 Kilcoole
 Kilcornie
 Kilcot
 Kilcreggan
 Killcullen
 Kilcurrig
 Kildale
 Kildarton
 Kildary
 Kildavin
 Kildimo
 Kildonan Castle
 Kildorough
 Kildorry
 Kildpart
 Kildress
 Kildwick
 Kilfenora
 Kilfinny
 Kilfree
 Kilfullert
 Kilgarvan
 Kilglass
 Kilgobnet
 Kilgowan
 Kilham
 Kilhampton
 Kilkee
 Kilkeel
 Kilkenny
 Kilkenzie
 Kilkerrin
 Kilkhampton
 Killadoon
 Killaloo
 Killane
 Killarney
 Killary
 Killegan
 Killegar
 Killena
 Killerig
 Killiecrankie
 Killeney
 Killour
 Killowen
 Killybegs
 Killygordon
 Kilmacrennan
 Kilmaine
 Kilmalcolm
 Kilmallock
 Kilmanahan
 Kilmarnock
 Kilmartin
 Kilmead
 Kilmelford
 Kilmersdon
 Kilmington
 Kilmore
 Kilmorey
 Kilmuckridge
 Kilmun
 Kimberley
 Kincardine
 King Alfred
 King David
 King Edward VII
 King George V
 King Henry
 King of Prussia
 King Orry
 King Sol
 Kingcup
 Kingfish
 Kingfisher
 Kingham
 Kingsale
 Kingsford
 Kingsmill
 Kingston
 Kingston Alalite
 Kingston Beryl
 Kingston Cairngorm
 Kingston Cornelian
 Kingston Galena
 Kingston Onyx
 Kingston Sapphire
 Kingussie
 Kinnairds Head
 Kinross
 Kinsale
 Kinsha
 Kipling
 Kirkliston
 Kistna
 Kitchen
 Kite
 Kittiwake
 
 
 Knole
 Kopanes
 Kos XXII
 Kos XXIII
 
 Kronprincen
 Kronprincessen

L

 L1
 L2
 L3
 L4
 L5
 L6
 L7
 L8
 L9
 L10
 L11
 L12
 L14
 L15
 L16
 L17
 L18
 L19
 L20
 L21
 L22
 L23
 L24
 L25
 L26
 L27
 L33
 L52
 L53
 L54
 L55
 L56
 L69
 L71

 La Capricieuse
 La Chieftain
 La Combatante
 La Cordeliere
 La Flore

 La Hulloise
 La Loire
 La Malbai
 La Malouine
 La Melpomène
 La Moqueuse

 L'Abondance
 Labuan
 Laburnum
 Lacedaemonian
 Lachine
 Lachlan
 Lachute
 Ladas
 Ladava
 Lady Canning
 Lady Elsa
 Lady Falkland
 Lady Hogarth
 Lady Lilian
 Lady Loch
 Lady Madeleine 
 Lady Nelson
 Lady Philomena
 Lady Prevost
 Lady Shirley
 
 
 
 
 Lae
 Laertes
 Laforey
 Lagan
 L'Aglaia
 
 Lal
 Laleston
 Lalmourn
 Lamerton
 Lamport
 Lanark
 
 
 Lance
 Landguard
 Landrail
 
 Langport
 Lantau
 Lanton
 Lapwing
 Largo Bay
 Largs
 Lark
 Larke
 Larkspur
 Larne
 Lasalle
 Lasham
 Lassoo
 Latona
 Latrobe
 Lauderdale
 
 
 Laura
 Laurel
 Laurestinus
 Lauzon
 Lavender
 Laverock
 Lavinia
 Lawford
 Lawrence
 Lawson
 Laymoor
 Le Havre
 Le Robecque
 Le Triomphant
 Leamington
 Leander
 Leaside
 Leda
 Ledbury
 Ledsham
 Lee
 Leeds Castle
 Leeds
 Leeuwin
 Legere
 Legion
 L'Egyptienne
 Leicester
 Leighton
 Leith
 Lennox
 Lenox
 Leocadia
 Leonidas
 Leopard
 Leopard's Whelp

 Lethbridge
 L'Etoile
 Letterston
 Levant
 Leven
 Leveret
 Leverton
 Leviathan
 Levis
 Lewes
 Lewiston
 Leyden
 L'Hercule
 Li Wo
 Liberty
 
 Lichfield
 Lichfield Prize
 Licorne
 Liddesdale
 Liffey
 Ligaera
 
 Lightfoot
 Lightning
 Lilac
 Lily
 Limbourne
 L'Impassable
 Linaria
 Lincoln
 L'Incomprise
 Lindisfarne
 Lindsey
 Ling
 Linganbar
 Lingfield
 Linnet
 Lion
 Lioness
 Lion's Whelp
 Lisburne
 Lismore
 Liston
 Listowel
 Lithgow

 Little Belt
 Little Charity
 Little London
 Little Unicorn
 Little Victory
 Littleham
 Lively
 Liverpool
 Lizard
 Llandaff
 Llandudno
 Llewellyn
 Lobelia
 Loch Achanault
 Loch Achray
 Loch Affric
 Loch Alvie
 Loch Ard
 Loch Arkaig
 Loch Arklet
 Loch Arnish
 Loch Assynt
 Loch Awe
 Loch Badcall
 Loch Boisdale
 Loch Bracadale
 Loch Carloway
 Loch Caroy
 Loch Carron
 Loch Clunie
 Loch Coulside
 Loch Craggie
 Loch Cree
 Loch Creran
 Loch Doine
 
 Loch Dunvegan
 Loch Earn
 Loch Eck
 Loch Eil
 Loch Enock
 Loch Ericht
 Loch Erisort
 Loch Eye
 Loch Eynort
 Loch Fada
 Loch Fannich
 Loch Fionn
 Loch Frisa
 Loch Fyne
 Loch Garasdale
 Loch Garve
 Loch Glashan
 Loch Glendhu
 Loch Goil
 Loch Gorm
 Loch Griam
 Loch Harport
 Loch Harray
 Loch Heilen
 Loch Hourne
 Loch Inchard
 Loch Insh
 Loch Katrine
 Loch Ken
 Loch Kilbirnie
 Loch Killin
 Loch Killisport
 Loch Kirbister
 Loch Kirkaig
 Loch Kishorn
 Loch Knockie
 Loch Laro
 Loch Laxford
 Loch Linfern
 Loch Linnhe
 Loch Lomond
 Loch Lubnaig
 Loch Lurgain
 Loch Lydoch
 Loch Lyon
 Loch Maberry
 Loch Maddy
 Loch Minnick
 Loch Mochrum
 Loch More
 Loch Morlich
 Loch Muick
 Loch Nell
 Loch Odairn
 Loch Ossain
 Loch Quoich
 Loch Roan
 Loch Ronald
 Loch Ruthven
 Loch Ryan
 Loch Scamdale
 Loch Scavaig
 Loch Scridain
 Loch Seaforth
 Loch Sheallag
 Loch Sheil
 Loch Shin
 Loch Skaig
 Loch Skerrow
 Loch Stemster
 Loch Stenness
 Loch Striven
 Loch Sunart
 Loch Swannay
 Loch Swin
 Loch Tanna
 Loch Tarbert
 Loch Tilt
 Loch Torridon
 Loch Tralaig
 Loch Tummel
 Loch Urigill
 Loch Vanavie
 Loch Vennachar
 Loch Veyatie
 Loch Watten
 Lochinvar
 Lochy
 Lockeport
 Locust
 Lofoten
 London
 Londonderry
 Longbow
 Longbranch
 Longford
 Longueuil
 Lonsdale
 Looe
 Lookout
 Loosestrife
 Lord Clive
 Lord Eldon
 Lord Howe
 Lord Melville
 
 Lord Nelson
 Lord Nuffield
 Lord Raglan
 Lord Roberts
 Lord Warden
 Loring
 Lossie
 
 Lotus
 Louis
 Louisa
 Louisburg
 Loup Cervier
 
 Love and Friendship
 
 Lowestoffe Prize
 Lowestoft
 
 Loyal Chancellor
 Loyal Example
 Loyal Exploit
 Loyal Explorer
 Loyal Express
 Loyal London
 Loyal Watcher
 Loyalist
 Loyalty
 
 
 
 
 
 
 
 
 
 
 
 
 
 
 
 
 
 
 
 
 
 
 
 
 
 
 
 
 
 
 
 
 
 
 
 
 
 
 
 
 
 
 
 
 
 
 
 
 
 
 
 
 
 
 
 
 
 
 
 
 
 
 
 
 
 
 
 
 
 
 
 
 
 
 
 
 
 
 
 Luce Bay
 Lucia
 Lucifer
 Ludham
 
 Ludlow Castle
 Lullington
 Lulworth
 Lunenburg
 Lupin
 Lurcher
 
 Lutin
 Lutine
 Lychnis
 Lydd
 Lydiard
 Lydney
 Lyemun
 
 Lyme Regis
 Lynn
 Lynx
 
 Lyra
 Lys
 Lysander

See also
 List of aircraft carriers of the Royal Navy
 List of amphibious warfare ships of the Royal Navy
 List of battlecruisers of the Royal Navy
 List of pre-dreadnought battleships of the Royal Navy
 List of dreadnought battleships of the Royal Navy
 List of cruiser classes of the Royal Navy
 List of destroyer classes of the Royal Navy
 List of patrol vessels of the Royal Navy
 List of frigate classes of the Royal Navy
 List of mine countermeasure vessels of the Royal Navy (includes minesweepers and mine hunters)
 List of monitors of the Royal Navy
 List of Royal Fleet Auxiliary ship names
 List of Royal Navy shore establishments
 List of submarines of the Royal Navy
 List of survey vessels of the Royal Navy

References
 

 I
Names I
Royal Navy I
Royal Navy ships I